The Women's 100m at the 1988 Summer Olympics in Seoul, South Korea had an entry list of 64 competitors, with eight qualifying heats (64), four second-round races (32) and two semifinals (16), before the final (8) took off on Sunday September 25, 1988.

Records
These were the standing World and Olympic records (in seconds) prior to the 1988 Summer Olympics.

The following Olympic records were set during this competition.

Results

Heats

Heat 1
Wind +1.1

Heat 2
Wind +0.4

Heat 3
Wind +0.0

Heat 4

Wind +1.1

Heat 5

Wind +0.1

Heat 6

Wind +0.2

Heat 7

Wind +1.0

Heat 8

Wind +0.1

Quarterfinals

Quarterfinal 1

Wind +0.5

Quarterfinal 2

Wind +1.6

Quarterfinal 3

Wind +1.0

Quarterfinal 4
Wind +0.0

Semifinals

Semifinal 1
Wind +0.5

Semifinal 2

Wind +2.6

Final
Wind +3.0

See also
 1987 Women's World Championships 100 metres (Rome)
 1990 Women's European Championships 100 metres (Split)
 1991 Women's World Championships 100 metres (Tokyo)
 1992 Women's Olympic 100 metres (Barcelona)

References

  Official Report

1
100 metres at the Olympics
1988 in women's athletics
Women's events at the 1988 Summer Olympics